Saen Parunchai (แสน พรัญชัย) is a Muay Thai fighter. He is a former Lumpinee Stadium Featherweight champion.

Titles and accomplishments

 2015 Lumpinee Stadium 126 lbs Champion

Fight record

|- style="background:#fbb;"
| 2018-09-27 || Loss||align=left| Sibsaen Tor.Iewjaroentongpuket||  || Bangkok, Thailand || Decision|| 5 || 3:00
|- style="background:#fbb;"
| 2018-09-01 || Loss||align=left| Sibsaen Tor.Iewjaroentongpuket|| Lumpinee Stadium || Bangkok, Thailand || Decision|| 5 || 3:00
|- style="background:#fbb;"
| 2016-12-09 || Loss||align=left| Mongkolpetch Petchyindee|| Lumpinee Stadium || Bangkok, Thailand || Decision|| 5 || 3:00
|-  style="background:#cfc;"
| 2016-06-24 || Win||align=left| Nuenglanlek Jitmuangnon || Central Stadium || Songkhla, Thailand || Decision || 5 || 3:00
|-  style="background:#fbb;"
| 2016-04-29|| Loss||align=left| Phet Utong Or. Kwanmuang|| Lumpinee Stadium || Bangkok, Thailand || KO (Right Uppercut) || 3 ||
|-  style="background:#fbb;"
| 2016-03-28|| Loss||align=left| Muangthai PKSaenchaimuaythaigym  ||  Southern Thailand || Thailand || KO (Left Upper Elbow) || 4 || 0:13
|-  style="background:#fbb;"
| 2016-03-04 || Loss||align=left| Muangthai PKSaenchaimuaythaigym  ||  Kriekkrai Fights, Lumpinee Stadium || Bangkok, Thailand || Decision || 5 || 3:00
|-  style="background:#cfc;"
| 2016-01-28|| Win||align=left| Panpayak Jitmuangnon || Petwithaya Fights, Rajadamnern Stadium || Bangkok, Thailand || Decision || 5 || 3:00
|- style="background:#fbb;"
| 2015-11-10|| Loss||align=left| Kaonar P.K.SaenchaiMuaythaiGym || Lumpinee Stadium || Bangkok, Thailand || Decision || 5 || 3:00
|- style="background:#cfc;"
| 2015-09-11|| Win||align=left| Songkom Nayoksanya || Lumpinee Stadium || Bangkok, Thailand || Decision || 5 || 3:00
|-  style="background:#fbb;"
| 2015-07-02 || Loss||align=left| Sangmanee Sor Tienpo || Tor.Chaiwat Fight, Rajadamnern Stadium || Bangkok, Thailand || Decision || 5 || 3:00
|-  style="background:#cfc;"
| 2015-06-05|| Win||align=left| Panpayak Jitmuangnon || Lumpinee Stadium || Bangkok, Thailand || Decision || 5 || 3:00 
|-
! style=background:white colspan=9 |
|-  style="background:#cfc;"
| 2015-05-08|| Win||align=left| Superlek Kiatmuu9   || Lumpinee Stadium || Bangkok, Thailand || Decision|| 5 || 3:00
|-  style="background:#c5d2ea;"
| 2015-04-05|| Draw||align=left| GrandPrixnoi Phetkiatphet  || Channel 7 Stadium || Bangkok, Thailand || Decision|| 5 || 3:00
|-  style="background:#fbb;"
| 2015-01-04|| Loss||align=left| Nawapon Lookpachrist  || Channel 7 Stadium || Bangkok, Thailand || KO || 2 ||
|-  style="background:#cfc;"
| 2014-11-04|| Win||align=left| Daotrang Sakniranrat    || Lumpinee Stadium || Bangkok, Thailand || KO || 3 ||
|- style="background:#fbb;"
| 2014-09-30|| Loss||align=left| Yodtongthai Sor.Sommai || Lumpinee Stadium || Bangkok, Thailand || Decision || 5 || 3:00
|-
! style=background:white colspan=9 |
|- style="background:#cfc;"
| 2014-08-05|| Win||align=left| Monkao Chor Janmanee || Lumpinee Stadium || Bangkok, Thailand || Decision || 5 || 3:00
|-  style="background:#fbb;"
| 2014-01-04 || Loss ||align=left| Rafi Bohic || Patong Boxing Stadium Sainamyen || Phuket, Thailand || KO (Left hook to the body) || 2 ||
|-  style="background:#c5d2ea;"
| 2013-06-28 || Draw||align=left|  Monkao Chor Janmanee ||  || Thailand || Decision || 5 || 3:00
|-  style="background:#cfc;"
| 2013-01-08 || Win ||align=left| Kwankhao Mor.Ratanabandit || Lumpinee Stadium || Bangkok, Thailand || Decision || 5 || 3:00
|-  style="background:#cfc;"
| 2012-11-20 || Win ||align=left| Poonsawan Lookprabaht || Lumpinee Stadium || Bangkok, Thailand || Decision || 5 || 3:00
|-  style="background:#cfc;"
| 2012-10-23 || Win ||align=left| Chalongsuk Kiatcharunchai || Lumpinee Stadium || Bangkok, Thailand || TKO (Knees) || 4 ||
|-  style="background:#cfc;"
| 2012-08-10 || Win ||align=left| Monkaw Chor.Chonmanee || Lumpinee Stadium || Bangkok, Thailand || Decision || 5 || 3:00
|-  style="background:#cfc;"
| 2011-10-24 || Win ||align=left| Denchiangkwan Laemthongkanpad || Rajadamnern Stadium || Bangkok, Thailand ||Decision || 5 ||3:00
|-  style="background:#fbb;"
| 2010-09-18 || Loss ||align=left| Kaimukdam Chuwattana || Omnoi Stadium || Thailand ||TKO || 4 ||
|-  style="background:#cfc;"
| 2008- || Win ||align=left| Nuenghtep EminentAir || Lumpinee Stadium || Thailand ||KO || 2 ||
|-  style="background:#fbb;"
| 2008- || Loss ||align=left| Rungphet Wor Rungniran|| Lumpinee Stadium || Thailand ||TKO || 4 ||
|-  style="background:#cfc;"
| 2008-03-25 || Win ||align=left| Amnuaydet Tded99 || Lumpinee Stadium || Bangkok, Thailand ||Decision || 5 ||3:00
|-  style="background:#cfc;"
| 2008- || Win||align=left| Jockylek Kiatprapat || Rajadamnern Stadium || Bangkok, Thailand ||Decision || 5 || 3:00
|-  style="background:#fbb;"
| 2007-11-30 || Loss||align=left| Kitti Kiatpraphat || Lumpinee Stadium || Bangkok, Thailand ||Decision || 5 || 3:00
|-  style="background:#cfc;"
| 2007- || Win||align=left| Worawut Sor || Rajadamnern Stadium || Bangkok, Thailand ||Decision || 5 || 3:00

|-
| colspan=9 | Legend:

References

1991 births
Saen Parunchai
Living people
Saen Parunchai